Jonathan Edward Gullis (born 9 January 1990) is a Conservative Party politician and former teacher, who has served as the Member of Parliament (MP) for Stoke-on-Trent North since 2019.

Education and early career 
Gullis attended Princethorpe College, an independent school near Rugby. He studied International Relations with Law at Oxford Brookes University and obtained a PGCE Secondary Citizenship at the Institute of Education (now part of UCL).

Gullis worked in schools from 2012 to 2019, comparing his teaching experiences to boxing. These included Blackfen School for Girls (2012–2015), Ashlawn School (2015–2016), Greenwood Academy (2016–2018), and Fairfax Academy (2018–2019). Gullis described his classroom personality as "a mixture of Boris Johnson and Jacob Rees-Mogg", and said that he "liked to play the character of an English gent". Gullis says that he was "nicknamed Grumpy Gullis – because I never smiled". Upon being elected to Parliament Gullis left work at Fairfax School, and he described the pupils he was responsible for as head of year as "probably happy to see me go".

Political career

Gullis was elected as a Conservative councillor in the Shipston ward of Stratford-upon-Avon in May 2011, until he resigned in October 2012 after starting a teaching job in London. Gullis came in for criticism, resigning three hours too late for a by-election to coincide with the area's 2012 PCC election on 15 November, an error costing in excess of £5,000 when the by-election was held two weeks later. Gullis, annoyed at his treatment by the local Conservative party, urged locals to vote for the Labour candidate, Jeff Kenner. Gullis is a member of the European Research Group.

He stood in Washington and Sunderland West at the 2017 general election, but lost to incumbent Labour MP Sharon Hodgson.

Gullis was elected as the MP for Stoke-on-Trent North at the 2019 general election, unseating Labour's Ruth Smeeth and becoming the first Conservative to represent the constituency. At the time of his election, Gullis was employed as a school teacher and head of year at Fairfax Academy in Sutton Coldfield, and served as the school's trade union representative.

On 30 April 2020, Gullis was criticised by Piers Morgan after he complained of the media's 'sick obsession' with the number of deaths during the coronavirus pandemic. Gullis was responding to a tweet by radio presenter James O'Brien. Gullis described comparisons with the number of deaths in other countries as 'lazy' in a now deleted tweet. He later apologised for his 'poor choice of words'. He has since closed his Twitter account.

In June 2020, Gullis introduced a Ten Minute Rule bill which would introduce custodial sentences of up to 14 years for those who desecrate war memorials. After the first reading the bill was withdrawn and did not proceed to become law.

In October 2020, after voting against a Labour Party Opposition Day Motion to extend free school meals until Easter 2021, Gullis said that he would not address a "baying mob" in response to an alleged planned protest during his visit to a church foodbank. He also cited COVID-19 restrictions on gatherings.

In October 2020, Gullis stated on his Facebook page that research by the National Maritime Museum into the Royal Navy's links to slavery was "leftwing ideological nonsense".

In November 2020, following an interim report on the connections between colonialism and properties now in the care of the National Trust, including links with historic slavery, Gullis was among the signatories of a letter to The Telegraph from the "Common Sense Group" of Conservative Parliamentarians. The letter accused the National Trust of being "coloured by cultural Marxist dogma, colloquially known as the 'woke agenda'".

On 23 February 2021, Gullis was prevented by the Deputy Speaker from taking part in a debate in the House of Commons from home for being inappropriately dressed. Gullis changed into a suit, and was then allowed to participate.

In May 2021, the Parliamentary Commissioner for Standards ordered Gullis to return £253.78 and apologise after breaking parliamentary rules by using "pre-paid House-provided stationery in a way that was contrary to the published rules which put the member in breach of the requirements of paragraph 16 of the code of conduct for members." Guillis confirmed this, returned the money, and apologised.

In October 2021, Gullis suggested at a fringe meeting during the Conservative Party conference that people using the term "white privilege" should be reported to the Home Office as extremists and that teachers found criticising the Conservative Party should be sacked.

Gullis has praised schemes for getting disabled people into work. He said there were significant "mental health benefits and physical health benefits" when people with Down syndrome are in work – and that it also saved the state money. He cited a video he saw about an American man with Down syndrome who had worked at McDonald's "for 30 years and had a happy life".

Gullis has described Black Lives Matter as "a Marxist organisation that wants to abolish the nuclear family and defund the police".

In January 2022, Gullis defended his decision to not wear a face covering in the Commons chamber, stating that masks were not mandatory in the Commons. According to the Stoke Sentinel, Gullis was "bellowing with his mouth wide open and appearing to rock backwards and forwards" in the Commons during Prime Minister's Questions, following a statement from the Leader of the SNP group, Ian Blackford, that implied over a million people had been plunged into poverty as a result of Conservative party policy. After Gullis' behaviour in the Commons went viral, the Speaker of the House Lindsay Hoyle was interviewed by The Times where he said he wanted members to stop "screaming and shouting" in the chamber.

In May 2022, regarding Home Office deportation flights, Gullis said that his constituents were "flabbergasted that the woke, wet and wobbly lot opposite are on the side of their lefty woke warriors, who are making sure these rapists and paedophiles remain in this United Kingdom, rather than standing up for the British people and their safety."

He resigned as Parliamentary Private Secretary to the Secretary of State for Northern Ireland on 5 July 2022 in the aftermath of the Chris Pincher scandal.

In December 2022, on BBC Radio 4's World at One programme, Gullis defended the government's plan to offshore the processing of asylum seekers to Rwanda. In response to a letter from senior Church of England bishops which criticised the plan, Gullis said: "I don't think unelected bishops in the House of Lords should be preaching about politics."

Government Minister
In September 2022, he was appointed as Parliamentary Under-Secretary of State for School Standards by the new Prime Minister Liz Truss. At his first appearance at the Despatch Box on 24 October 2022, he was rebuked by the Speaker for not adopting a sufficiently Ministerial tone. Later the same week, he was dismissed from his position by Truss's successor, Rishi Sunak. Gullis announced his intention to support the Government from the backbenches.

Personal life
In March 2020, as part of a mental health awareness campaign run by the Stoke Sentinel, Gullis said that he has suffered with depression, self-harm and suicidal thoughts during periods of his life.

In June 2020, in a parliamentary debate on divorce law reform, Gullis said that he has gone through a divorce and supported the "no fault" divorce proposal.

Gullis has one daughter and one son with his partner, Nkita. Gullis is deaf in one ear.

References

External links

1990 births
Living people
Deaf politicians
Alumni of Oxford Brookes University
Alumni of the UCL Institute of Education
UK MPs 2019–present
Conservative Party (UK) MPs for English constituencies
Schoolteachers from the West Midlands